a tail boom refers to part of an aircraft:
a Helicopter tail 
 Twin-boom aircraft